Lamen may refer to:

Ramen or lamen, a Japanese noodle soup
Lamen (magic), a magical pendant or breastplate worn around the neck so that it hangs upon the breast over the heart
Lamen Island, a inhabited island in Shefa Province of Vanuatu in the Pacific Ocean